This is a list of electoral results for the Electoral district of North Murchison in Western Australian state elections.

Members for North Murchison

Election results

Elections in the 1900s

 Moorhead had been elected unopposed at the previous election (a ministerial by-election in 1899).

Elections in the 1890s

References

Western Australian state electoral results by district